Cape Batterbee is a small, rocky point on the coast, the most northerly cape of Enderby Land. It is located 92 km north of Mount Elkins.

Discovery and naming
Cape Batterbee was discovered by BANZARE (1929–31) on 13 January 1930. Named by Sir Douglas Mawson after Sir Henry Fagg Batterbee, Assistant Secretary of the Dominions Office, London, at the time of the expedition.

Important Bird Area
A 151 ha site comprising the cape, a nearby offshore island and the intervening sea ice has been identified as an Important Bird Area (IBA) by BirdLife International because it supports some 31,000 breeding pairs of Adélie penguins (as estimated from 2011 satellite imagery).

See also
 Aagaard Islands, group of small islands to the west of Cape Batterbee 
 History of Antarctica
 List of Antarctic expeditions

References

External links
 Australian Antarctic Division
 Australian Antarctic Gazetteer
 Scientific Committee on Antarctic Research (SCAR)
 PDF Map of the Australian Antarctic Territory
 United States Geological Survey, Geographic Names Information System (GNIS)

Important Bird Areas of Antarctica
Penguin colonies
Batterbee